Vox Archangeli is a Swedish musical band combining original Gregorian chants from early medieval times with modern electronic sounds. Members are Anna Pihl Lindén, Veikko Kiiver and Pär Lindén, all on vocals, with Pär Lindén also playing the flute. The inspiration for Vox Archangelis music comes from a wide range of musical influences, from classical and folk music, through to pop and rock. They are signed to Heart Song Records. Distribution is by Plugged Music and worldwide through X5 Music.

They are famous for their Sanctus series dedicated to various angel. Their debut album  was Sanctus: Michael in 2009 produced by the Grammy winning Dan Sundquist, with the follow-up album continuing on the Sanctus project was 2010 album Sanctus: Gabriel produced by Daniel Palm and the third album Sancts:Raphael produced by Peter Nordahl and Moh Denebi. 

In addition to the vocal tracks introducing a new musical genre called Gregorian Lounge Music, their music features instrumental air movements, created in co-operation with Jonas Strömberg at Slowbeat Studio and representing a continuing theme with 4 movements in Sanctus: Michael, also 4 in Sanctus: Gabriel and a further 5 in Sanctus: Raphael.

Discography

Singles

Other non-charting singles
2011: "We Are Free" (Vox Archangeli's version of theme from Gladiator

References

External links
Vox Archangeli Official website

Swedish musical groups